Koiak 5 - Coptic Calendar - Koiak 7

The sixth day of the Coptic month of Koiak, the fourth month of the Coptic year. On a common year, this day corresponds to December 2, of the Julian Calendar, and December 15, of the Gregorian Calendar. This day falls in the Coptic season of Peret, the season of emergence. This day falls in the Nativity Fast.

Commemorations

Saints 

 The martyrdom of Saint Anatole the Presbyter 
 The departure of Pope Abraam, the sixty-second Patriarch of the See of Saint Mark

References 

Days of the Coptic calendar